Washington Park (also known as Washington Square) is a small public, urban park (1 acre) located in Downtown Dubuque, Iowa, United States.  The park encompasses an entire city block, bordered on the north by West 7th Street, on the west by Bluff Street, on the south by West 6th Street, and on the east by Locust Street. The park is located between the city's post office and the Dubuque Museum of Art.

It was individually listed on the National Register of Historic Places in 1977, and it was included as a contributing property in the Cathedral Historic District in 1985.

History
The block where Washington Park is located today was one of the original 35 blocks plotted out by surveyor G.W. Harrison in 1833 when the city was founded.  From the beginning, the land was set aside for public use.  The first church and first jail in Iowa were located on this land.  In 1857, the area was designated as Washington Park.

In 1877, the Dubuque City Council had all the buildings on the block torn down.  Shrubs and flowers were planted, walkways were established, and a -high Oriental gazebo was built on the grounds for $200.  This gazebo, which was built by local architects Fridolin Heer and Edward Eaescher, was widely viewed as one of the finest pavilions in the area.  On August 24, 1877, approximately 2,000 people attended the formal dedication of the park.

In 1878, a public drinking fountain was erected in the park.  The city paid for half the cost, with the remaining half covered by private donations.  A statue of Dr. Henry Cogswell was placed on top of this drinking fountain.  Cogswell had promised the city that he would donate a statue for the fountain (which was supposed to be of a local heroine who had walked some distance to stop a train before it could come to a washed out bridge and derail).  When the statue was uncovered for the first time, it turned out to be a statue of Cogswell.  The statue remained in place until 1900, when a group of vandals pulled the statue down and buried it under what would be a new sidewalk.  The following day, the new sidewalk was poured which entombed the object.  The water fountain was gone by 1912, however, the statue is rumoured to still be buried under a sidewalk at the park.

Public events at the square over the years included Buffalo Bill Cody's "Authentic Wild West Show" performing in 1896 and President William McKinley giving a speech in 1899.

By the beginning of the 20th century, the gazebo was gone.  Later, during the 1970s, the park underwent a $60,000 restoration.  New trees, flowers, and shrubs were planted.  New lights crafted to look like antique gas lamps were placed in the park.  A new steel 3/4 size replica of the original gazebo built by Bradley Iron Works was placed on the site.  This restoration was made possible by the Dubuque Jaycees who made a large financial contribution to the City of Dubuque.  Also the Dubuque Jaycees had put together a time capsule using a donated grave vault.  Boxes were handed out to the public who were asked to place items in the boxes and return to the Park when they would be placed in the time capsule.  Once the boxes filled the vault it was sealed and buried right next to the southern side of the gazebo under the rock with the plaque that explains it is not to be opened for 100 years.  That opening is set for the year 2076.

During the summer of 2005, Washington Park underwent further improvements.  The streets surrounding the park have been rebuilt, and the walkways in and around the park have been replaced.  Lampposts designed to look like late 19th and early 20th century models have also been placed in and around the park.  Again without the Dubuque Jaycees large financial contribution this project would have been delayed.  The Dubuque Jaycees has a special interest in Washington Park. Numerous times the group has been called upon and responded financially for the betterment of the park.  The Group also decorates the park with a holiday theme each and every year.

See also
Parks in Dubuque, Iowa

References

Parks in Dubuque, Iowa
Gardens in Iowa
Landscape architecture
History of Iowa
National Register of Historic Places in Dubuque, Iowa
Parks on the National Register of Historic Places in Iowa
Individually listed contributing properties to historic districts on the National Register in Iowa